The Euro step, two-step, or long lateral is a basketball move in which an offensive player picks up their dribble, takes a step in one direction, and then quickly takes a second step in another direction. It is intended to allow the offensive player to evade a defender and attack the basket.

Background
According to Wall Street Journal writer Ben Cohen, the Euro step is a crafty and exotic move introduced in the NBA over two decades ago to "plant one way, take one long step at full speed the other way, avoid contact and sneak around the defender for an easy layup." This misdirection move, which allows players to gather a dribble and take two additional steps has stirred controversy in the NBA surrounding its legality as it finds itself on the edge of a traveling violation, as reported by The New York Times writer Jonathan Abrams.

According to The New York Times writer Jonathan Abrams,

The move is a crafty way to distribute the two steps allocated to a player after he stops dribbling, and it goes right to the edge of being a traveling violation.

Anecdotal reports indicate that officials not familiar with the move may call it a traveling violation. Today, the Euro step is often used when a player drives to the hoop, and it can be especially effective when a shorter guard takes on a taller forward or center. In a 2018 ESPN.com story on the move, writer Jordan Brenner said, "It has changed the way players navigate the defense to reach the rim and, with it, the game of basketball itself," also adding that the move "would end up altering the very balance of power between penetrator and defender."

History
While the first confirmed media use of the term "Euro step" was not seen until 2007, the move has a decades-long history in European basketball. In Brenner's 2018 story, he noted that longtime coach Vlade Đurović had seen early versions of the move around 1960. Đurović himself said in the story, "That move was normal in Europe, especially in Yugoslavia". It's nearly impossible to pinpoint the Eurostep's Big Bang moment. Instead, it has evolved over time on the hardwood, with Eastern Europe as its incubator -- and the mid-1980s as the beginning of the move's modern era. Back then, Toni Kukoc was a 17-year-old phenom playing for his home club of Jugoplastika in Split, Croatia, where practices routinely lasted eight or nine hours and coach Slavko Trninic emphasized finding different ways to get to the basket. To emulate a defender trying to take a charge, Trninic would place a chair in the middle of the lane, then tell players to dribble from the 3-point line and attempt to finish at the rim.  The move was  popularized in North America in the 2000s by Manu Ginóbili, who arrived in the NBA from the Italian league, though Ginobili honed the move while playing on playgrounds in his native Argentina. It has since been adopted by many American-born players, among them James Harden and Dwyane Wade. According to Brenner, the physical gifts of another European player, Giannis Antetokounmpo, have led his version of the Euro step to become "the final phase of the move's evolution," adding:

A FiveThirtyEight study showed that he covers just over 15 feet off a single dribble when driving to the basket. Add that to his 7-foot-3 wingspan and he can start his Eurostep from the 3-point line. . . . James Naismith never could've envisioned two steps like Antetokounmpo's. Two steps that cover 15 feet. Two steps that render the area between the top of the key and the basket all but undefendable. The Greek Freak and others have weaponized footwork by stretching the rules to their limit. In doing so, they have fundamentally changed the way basketball is played and how we see it.

While the Euro step was in common use in the NBA before 2009, it did not become technically legal until 2009. Prior to 2009, the NBA rule book had always said a player could only take one step. In 2009, it changed to read "A player who receives the ball while he is progressing or upon completion of a dribble, may take two steps in coming to a stop, passing or shooting the ball." When the change was made, ESPN noted "It is believed to be the first time any league, at any level anywhere in the world, has explicitly allowed two steps."

References

External links
 How to Perform the Euro Step With Iman Shumpert via YouTube

Basketball terminology